The von Magnus phenomenon describes the generation of  defective interfering particles (DIPs) by viruses. It was first observed by Preben von Magnus in influenza viruses, after the serial passage of undiluted allantoic fluid in eggs.

References

Virology